Quinta Steenbergen (born 2 April 1985 in Schagen) is a Dutch volleyball player, who plays as a Center. She was a member of the Women's National Team. She plays for VK AGEL Prostějov.

Personal
Steenbergen has one older brother and two older sisters.

Clubs
  AMVJ Amstelveen (2001–2003)
  VC Weert (2003–2004)
  AMVJ Amstelveen (2004–2008)
  Rocheville Le Cannet (2008–2009)
  TVC Amstelveen (2010–2011)
  VC Baku (2011–2012)
  Schweriner SC (2012–2013)
  VK AGEL Prostějov (2013–2014)
  Lokomotiv Baku (2014–2015)
  VK AGEL Prostějov (2015–2016)

References

External links
 FIVB Profile

1985 births
Living people
Dutch women's volleyball players
People from Schagen
Expatriate volleyball players in France
Expatriate volleyball players in Germany
Lokomotiv Baku volleyball players
European Games competitors for the Netherlands
Volleyball players at the 2015 European Games
Volleyball players at the 2016 Summer Olympics
Expatriate volleyball players in Azerbaijan
Expatriate volleyball players in the Czech Republic
Dutch expatriate sportspeople in France
Dutch expatriate sportspeople in Azerbaijan
Dutch expatriate sportspeople in the Czech Republic
Olympic volleyball players of the Netherlands
Sportspeople from North Holland
Dutch expatriate sportspeople in Germany